Taiwan competed under the designated name "Chinese Taipei" at the 2020 Summer Olympics in Tokyo. Originally scheduled to take place from 24 July to 9 August 2020, the Games were postponed to 23 July to 8 August 2021, due to the COVID-19 pandemic. It was also the nation's tenth consecutive appearance at the Summer Olympics.

Taiwan rewards their Olympic gold medalists with 20 million New Taiwan dollars (US $716,000) and additionally rewards their athletes who finish from second to seventh or eighth in their events with proportionate trickled down amounts.

Medalists

| width="78%" align="left" valign="top" |

| width="22%" align="left" valign="top" |

Competitors 
The following is the list of number of competitors in the Games.

Archery 

Taiwanese archers qualified each for the men's and women's events by reaching the quarterfinal stage of their respective team recurves at the 2019 World Archery Championships in 's-Hertogenbosch, Netherlands.

The Taiwanese archery team for the Games, led by two-time Olympian Tan Ya-ting and reigning world champion Lei Chien-ying in the women's individual recurve, was announced on 16 January 2020, based on the results at the Olympic Team Trials.

Men

Women

Mixed

Athletics

Taiwanese athletes further achieved the entry standards, either by qualifying time or by world ranking, in the following track and field events (up to a maximum of 3 athletes in each event), plus a female sprinter for Universality places:

Track & road events

Field events

Badminton 

Chinese Taipei entered five badminton players for each of the following events into the Olympic tournament based on the BWF Race to Tokyo Rankings.

Boxing 

Chinese Taipei entered four female boxers into the Olympic tournament. Reigning world bantamweight champion Huang Hsiao-wen (women's flyweight), 2019 world bronze medalist Lin Yu-ting (women's featherweight), Wu Shih-yi (women's lightweight), and Rio 2016 Olympian Chen Nien-chin (women's welterweight) secured the spots on the Taiwanese squad by advancing to the semifinal match of their respective weight divisions at the 2020 Asia & Oceania Qualification Tournament in Amman, Jordan.

Canoeing

Slalom
Chinese Taipei entered one canoeist to compete in the women's K-1 class at the Games, as the International Canoe Federation accepted the nation's request to claim an unused berth from the 2020 Oceania Championships.

Cycling

Road
Chinese Taipei entered one rider each to compete in the men's Olympic road race, by finishing in the top two, not yet qualified, at the 2019 Asian Championships in Tashkent, Uzbekistan.

Equestrian

Chinese Taipei entered one jumping rider into the Olympic competition by finishing in the top two, outside the group selection, of the individual FEI Olympic Rankings for Group G (South East Asia and Oceania).

Jumping

Golf 

Chinese Taipei entered one male golfer and two female golfers into the Olympic tournament.

Gymnastics

Artistic
Chinese Taipei fielded a full team of five artistic gymnasts (four men and one woman) into the Olympic competition. The men's squad claimed one of the remaining nine spots in the team all-around at the 2019 World Championships in Stuttgart, Germany, making its first trip to the Games since 1964. On the women's side, Ting Hua-tien received a spare berth from the apparatus events, as one of the twelve highest-ranked gymnasts, neither part of the team nor qualified directly through the all-around, at the same tournament. The men's team was announced on 6 June 2021.

Men
Team

Individual

Women

Judo
 
Chinese Taipei entered three judoka (one men and two women) into the Olympic tournament based on the International Judo Federation Olympics Individual Ranking.

Karate
 
Chinese Taipei entered two karateka into the inaugural Olympic tournament. 2018 world bronze medalist Wen Tzu-yun qualified directly for the women's kumite 55-kg category by finishing among the top four karateka at the end of the combined WKF Olympic Rankings.

Kumite

Kata

Rowing

Chinese Taipei qualified one boat in the women's single sculls for the Games by winning the bronze medal and securing the first of five berths available at the 2021 FISA Asia & Oceania Olympic Qualification Regatta in Tokyo, Japan.

Qualification Legend: FA=Final A (medal); FB=Final B (non-medal); FC=Final C (non-medal); FD=Final D (non-medal); FE=Final E (non-medal); FF=Final F (non-medal); SA/B=Semifinals A/B; SC/D=Semifinals C/D; SE/F=Semifinals E/F; QF=Quarterfinals; R=Repechage

Shooting 

Taiwanese shooters achieved quota places for the following events by virtue of their best finishes at the 2018 ISSF World Championships, the 2019 ISSF World Cup series, and Asian Championships, as long as they obtained a minimum qualifying score (MQS) by 31 May 2020.

Swimming

Taiwanese swimmers further achieved qualifying standards in the following events (up to a maximum of 2 swimmers in each event at the Olympic Qualifying Time (OQT), and potentially 1 at the Olympic Selection Time (OST)):

Table tennis

Chinese Taipei entered six athletes into the table tennis competition at the Games. The men's and women's teams secured their respective berths by advancing to the quarterfinal round of the 2020 World Olympic Qualification Event in Gondomar, Portugal, permitting a maximum of two starters to compete each in the men's and women's singles tournament. Moreover, an additional berth was awarded to the Taiwanese table tennis players competing in the inaugural mixed doubles by advancing to the semifinal stage of the 2019 ITTF World Tour Grand Finals in Zhengzhou, China.

Men

Women

Mixed

Taekwondo 

Chinese Taipei entered four athletes into the taekwondo competition at the Games. Huang Yu-jen (men's 68 kg), Rio 2016 Olympian and 2015 world champion Liu Wei-ting (men's 80 kg), reigning Asian Games gold medalist Su Po-ya (women's 49 kg), and Lo Chia-ling (women's 57 kg) secured the spots on the Taiwanese taekwondo squad with a top two finish each in their respective weight classes at the 2021 Asian Qualification Tournament in Amman, Jordan.

Tennis

Weightlifting 

Chinese Taipei weightlifters qualified for 7 quota places at the games, based on the Tokyo 2020 Rankings Qualification List of 20 June 2021.

Men

Women

References

Nations at the 2020 Summer Olympics
2020
2021 in Taiwanese sport